Carmine Mowbray is a Republican Senator in the Montana Legislature.  She was appointed on January 20, 2011, to Senate District 6, representing Polson, Montana.  She was co-owner of Western Publishing Company from 1976 to 1989 and the Lake County Leader from 1981 to 2000.

References

External links
 Home page

Living people
1953 births
Republican Party Montana state senators
Politicians from Seattle
People from Polson, Montana
Women state legislators in Montana
21st-century American women